Renate Vogel (later Heinrich and Bauer, born 30 June 1955) is a retired East German breaststroke swimmer. She had her best achievements in the 4 × 100 m medley relay, setting two world records in 1973 and 1974, and winning a silver medal at the 1972 Summer Olympics and two gold medals at the 1973 World Aquatics Championships and 1974 European Aquatics Championships. She also won two world titles in the 100 m and 200 breaststroke events in 1973, and set two world records in the 100 m breaststroke in 1974.

In 1979, she fled to West Germany by boarding a plane from Budapest to Munich with a false West German passport. There she gave a series of interviews disclosing details of the East German training system and later worked as a swimming coach.

Her cousin, the late Helga Lindner also competed in swimming at the 1972 Olympics.

References

1955 births
Living people
Sportspeople from Chemnitz
German female swimmers
Female breaststroke swimmers
Olympic swimmers of East Germany
Swimmers at the 1972 Summer Olympics
Olympic silver medalists for East Germany
Medalists at the 1972 Summer Olympics
World Aquatics Championships medalists in swimming
European Aquatics Championships medalists in swimming
East German defectors
East German emigrants to West Germany
East German female swimmers
Olympic silver medalists in swimming